Govt Degree College Tangdhar is a government college in Karnah tehsil of Kupwara district in the Indian union territory of Jammu and Kashmir. It was established in April 2008 and is the only college in the tehsil. Professor Basharat Qadri was the first principal of Govt. Degree College Tangdhar. The college is located in upper Kandi village of Karnah which is two kilometre away from the main town of Tangdhar. The college offers undergraduate courses in science and arts.

The college is affiliated to the University of Kashmir in Srinagar.

See also
Degree Colleges in Kashmir

References

greaterkashmir.com
outlookindia.com
gcoekmr.org

External links

Educational institutions established in 2008
2008 establishments in Jammu and Kashmir
Kupwara district